Dean Cook is a British actor, best known for playing Ashley Thompson on the sitcom Time Gentlemen Please, and for his appearance in the 2000 The Little Vampire.

His younger sister, Billie (b.1993), is an actress in television and film.

References

External links

English male television actors
English male film actors
Living people
English male child actors
Place of birth missing (living people)
Year of birth missing (living people)